Koinia is an extinct genus of temnospondyl amphibian from the Late Permian of Russia. It is an archegosauroid in the subfamily Melosaurinae. Koinia was named in 1993 with the description of the type species K. silantjevi, based on fossils that were found in the Ocher Assemblage Zone, near the Vym River in the Komi Republic.

Phylogeny
Below is a cladogram modified from Ruta et al. (2007) showing the relationship of Koinia to other archegosauroids:

References

Permian amphibians
Fossils of Russia
Prehistoric amphibian genera